This is a list of military installations owned or used by the United States Armed Forces both in the United States and around the world. This list details only current or recently closed facilities; some defunct facilities are found at :Category:Closed military installations of the United States.

An "installation" is defined as "a military base, camp, post, station, yard, center, homeport facility for any ship, or other activity under the jurisdiction of the Department of Defense, including leased space, that is controlled by, or primarily supports DoD's activities. An installation may consist of one or more sites" (geographically-separated real estate parcels).

The United States operates a global network of military installations and is by far the largest operator of military bases in the world, with locations in dozens of nations on every continent, with 38 "named bases" having active-duty, US National Guard, reserve, or civilian personnel as of September 30, 2014. Its largest, in terms of personnel, is Ramstein Air Base, in Germany, with almost 9,200. The Pentagon stated in 2013 that there are "around" 5,000 bases total, with "around" 600 of them overseas. Due to the sensitive and often classified nature of this information, there is no comprehensive list with the exact number or location of all bases, stations and installations. The total number of foreign sites with installations and facilities that are either in active use and service, or that may be activated and operated by American military personnel and allies, is just over 1,000.

U.S. officials have been accused of collaborating with oppressive regimes and anti-democratic governments to secure their military bases, from Central America to Africa, Asia, and the Middle East. The Democracy Index classifies many of the forty-five current non-democratic U.S. base hosts as fully "authoritarian governments." Military bases in non-democratic states were often rationalized during the Cold War by the U.S. as a necessary but undesirable necessity in defending against the communist threat posed by the Soviet Union. Few of these bases have been abandoned since the end of the Cold War.

Several rounds of closures and mergers have occurred since the end of World War II, a procedure most recently known as Base Realignment and Closure. Anti-racist agitation in the early 2020s led to calls for changing bases to remove the names of Confederate figures who fought against the United States in the American Civil War. The Naming Commission was created by the National Defense Authorization Act for Fiscal Year 2021, and renaming began in December 2022.



Joint bases

Domestic 
 The Pentagon
 Joint Base Elmendorf–Richardson – located 12 kilometers (8 miles) north of Anchorage, Alaska
 Joint Base Pearl Harbor–Hickam – located 11 kilometers (7 miles) northwest of Honolulu, Hawaii
 Joint Base McGuire–Dix–Lakehurst – located 29 kilometers (18 miles) south of Trenton, New Jersey
 Joint Base Charleston – located 8 kilometers (5 miles) east of North Charleston, South Carolina
 Joint Base San Antonio – located 8 kilometers (5 miles) north of San Antonio, Texas
 Joint Base Langley-Eustis – located 12 kilometers (8 miles) east of Newport News, Virginia
 Joint Base Myer-Henderson Hall – located 1 kilometer (1 mile) northwest of Arlington, Virginia
 Joint Expeditionary Base–Little Creek – located 20 kilometers (13 miles) northwest of Virginia Beach
 Joint Base Lewis-McChord – located 17 kilometers (11 miles) southwest of Tacoma, Washington
 Joint Base Anacostia-Bolling – located 11 kilometers (7 miles) south of Washington, D.C.
 Joint Base Andrews – located 22 kilometers (14 miles) south of Washington, D.C.

Foreign 
 War Reserve Stocks are located in many foreign states.

Australia 
 Pine Gap – Joint Defence Facility Pine Gap (JDFPG), near Alice Springs, Northern Territory. 
 Naval Communication Station Harold E. Holt – located on the northwest coast of Australia, 6 kilometres (4 mi) north of the town of Exmouth, Western Australia. 
 Robertson Barracks – located in Darwin, Northern Territory.
 Australian Defence Satellite Communications Station – located near Kojarena 30 km east of Geraldton, Western Australia.
 Other U.S. bases in Australia are present and this list does not include ADF bases with U.S. access. The U.S. military has access to all major ADF training areas, northern Australian RAAF airfields, port facilities in Darwin, Fremantle, Stirling naval base in Perth, and the airfield on the Cocos Islands in the Indian Ocean.

Guam
Joint Region Marianas – combines Naval Base Guam, Andersen Air Force Base and Marine Corps Base Camp Blaz

Iraq 

 There are approximately 2,500 U.S. service members in Iraq, spread across several facilities in Iraq and other bases in Iraqi Kurdistan, being used as training bases for Iraqi and Kurdish forces as well as launching operations against targets in Syria.

 Al-Anbar Governorate
 Al Asad Airbase
 Camp Habbaniyah
 Baghdad Governorate
 Camp Victory
 Duhok Governorate
 Atrush Field

 Erbil Governorate
 Al-Harir Air Base
 Erbil International Airport
 Nineveh Governorate
 Kariz near Zummar
 Saladin Governorate
 Balad Air Base

Niger 

The U.S. operates drone bases from three locations across Niger. These locations are staffed by several hundred U.S. Special Operations Forces in a non-combat role, aiding the Nigerien military with training and surveillance.
Arlit
Nigerien Air Base 201, Agadez  
Niamey

Syria 

There were approximately 1,500–2,000 U.S. Marine and Special Operations Forces in Syria, spread across 12 different facilities, being used as training bases for Kurdish rebels. These soldiers withdrew from Syria to western Iraq in October 2019. Meanwhile, the New York Times reported that the Pentagon was planning to "leave 150 Special Operations forces at a base called al-Tanf", where the United States is training Free Syrian Army rebels. In addition, 200 U.S. soldiers would remain in eastern Syria near the oil fields, to prevent the Islamic State, Syrian government and Russian forces from advancing in the region.

According to the Head of the Syrian Arab Republic delegation to Astana talks the U.S. presence in Syria is "illegal" and "without the consent of (the) government".

United States Army

This is a list of links for U.S. Army forts and installations, organized by U.S. state or territory within the U.S. and by country if overseas.  For consistency, major Army National Guard (ARNG) training facilities are included but armory locations are not.

Domestic

Alabama 
 Anniston Army Depot
 Fort Rucker (Fort Novosel)
 Redstone Arsenal
 Fort McClellan (ARNG)

American Samoa 
 Pele U.S. Army Reserve Center & Coast Guard Marine Safety Detachment Samoa

Alaska 
 Fort Greely
 Fort Wainwright
 Joint Base Elmendorf–Richardson

Arizona 
 Camp Navajo (ARNG)
 Davis-Monthan AFB
 Fort Huachuca
 Luke AFB
 Yuma Proving Ground

Arkansas 
 Robinson Maneuver Training Center (ARNG)
 Fort Chaffee Maneuver Training Center (ARNG)
 Pine Bluff Arsenal
 Little Rock AFB

California 
 Beale Air Force Base
 Camp Cooke
 Camp Haan
 Camp Roberts (ARNG)
 Camp San Luis Obispo (ARNG)
 Coast Guard Air Station Sacramento
 Fort Hunter Liggett
 Fort Irwin
 Los Alamitos Joint Forces Training Base
 Los Angeles AFB 
 Military Ocean Terminal Concord
 Naval Air Station North Island
 Parks Reserve Forces Training Area
 Presidio of Monterey
 San Joaquin Depot
 Sharpe Facility
 Stockton's Rough & Ready Island
 Tracy Facility
 Sierra Army Depot

Colorado 
 Buckley Space Force Base
 Cheyenne Mountain Space Force Station
 Fort Carson
 Fort Logan National Cemetery
 Peterson Space Force Base
 Pueblo Chemical Depot
 Rocky Mountain Arsenal
 Schriever Space Force Base
 U.S. Air Force Academy

Connecticut 
 Camp Nett (ARNG)

Delaware 
 Bethany Beach Training Site (ARNG)

District of Columbia 
 Fort Lesley J. McNair
 Joint Base Anacostia Bolling

Florida 
 Camp Blanding (ARNG)
 Eglin Air Force Base
 Hurlburt Field
 MacDill Air Force Base
 Patrick Space Force Base
 Tyndall Air Force Base
 Naval Air Station Jacksonville
 Naval Station Mayport
 Shades of Green (Morale, Welfare and Recreation (MWR) Resort)

Georgia 
 Camp Frank D. Merrill
 Fort Benning (Fort Moore)
 Fort Gordon (Fort Eisenhower)
 Fort Stewart
 Hunter Army Airfield

Hawaii 
 Fort DeRussy (MWR Resort)
 Hale Koa Hotel
 Fort Shafter
 Kunia Field Station
 Pohakuloa Training Area
 Schofield Barracks
 Tripler Army Medical Center
 Wheeler Army Airfield

Idaho 
 MTA Gowen Field Boise (ARNG)
 Orchard Range TS Boise (ARNG)
 TS Edgemeade Mountain Home (ARNG)

Illinois 
 Camp Lincoln (ARNG)
 Charles M. Price Support Center
 Rock Island Arsenal

Indiana 
 Camp Atterbury (ARNG)
 Fort Benjamin Harrison
 Muscatatuck Urban Training Center

Iowa 
 Camp Dodge
 Fort Des Moines (ARNG)
 Iowa Army Ammunition Plant

Kansas 
 Fort Leavenworth
 Fort Riley
 Great Plains Joint Training Center (ARNG)

Kentucky 
 Blue Grass Army Depot
 Fort Campbell
 Fort Knox

Louisiana 
 Barksdale Air Force Base
 Camp Beauregard
 Fort Polk (Fort Johnson)

Maine 
 MTA Deepwoods (ARNG)
 MTA Riley-Bog Brook (ARNG)
 TS Caswell (ARNG)
 TS Hollis Plains (ARNG)

Maryland 
 Aberdeen Proving Ground
 Camp Fretterd Military Reservation (ARNG)
 Fort Detrick
 Fort George G. Meade
 Joint Base Andrews

Massachusetts 
 Camp Curtis Guild (ARNG)
 Camp Edwards (ARNG)
 Fort Devens
 Natick Army Soldiers Systems Center

Michigan 
 Camp Grayling (ARNG)
 Detroit Arsenal
 Fort Custer (ARNG)
Selfridge Air Base

Minnesota 
 Camp Ripley (ARNG)

Mississippi 
 Camp McCain (ARNG)
 Camp Shelby
 Mississippi Ordnance Plant

Missouri 
 Camp Clark, Missouri (ARNG)
 Fort Leonard Wood

Montana 
 Fort William Henry Harrison (ARNG)

Nebraska 
 Camp Ashland (ARNG)

Nevada 
 Hawthorne Army Ammunition Depot
 Nellis AFB

New Hampshire 
 Center Strafford Training Site (ARNG)

New Jersey 
 Fort Dix, part of Joint Base McGuire–Dix–Lakehurst
 Picatinny Arsenal

New Mexico 
 Kirtland AFB
 Los Alamos Demolition Range
 White Sands Missile Range

New York 
 Camp Smith (New York) (ARNG)
 Fort Drum
 Fort Hamilton
 United States Military Academy
 Watervliet Arsenal

North Carolina 
 Camp Butner (ARNG)
 Camp Davis
 Camp Mackall
 Fort Bragg (Fort Liberty)
 Military Ocean Terminal Sunny Point
 Seymour Johnson Air Force Base

North Dakota 
 Camp Grafton (ARNG)

Ohio 
 Camp Perry (ARNG)
 Camp Ravenna Joint Military Training Center (ARNG)
 Camp Sherman (ARNG)
 Wright-Patterson Air Force Base

Oklahoma 
 Camp Gruber (ARNG)
 Fort Sill
 McAlester Army Ammunition Plant
 Tinker AFB

Oregon 
 Camp Rilea (ARNG)

Pennsylvania 
 Carlisle Barracks
 Fort Indiantown Gap (ARNG)
 Harrisburg Military Post (ARNG)
 Letterkenny Army Depot
 New Cumberland Army Depot
 Tobyhanna Army Depot

Puerto Rico 
 Army National Guard Aviation Support Facility (ARNG)
 Camp Santiago (ARNG)
 Fort Allen (ARNG)
 Fort Buchanan
 Roosevelt Roads Army Reserve Base

Rhode Island 
 Camp Fogarty (East Greenwich, RI) (ARNG)
 Camp Varnum (ARNG)
 Fort Greene (USAR)

South Carolina 
 Fort Jackson (Army Basic Training Center)
 Charleston Air Force Base (part of Joint Base Charleston - AF/USN)
 McEntire Joint National Guard Base (ARNG/ANG)
 South Carolina National Guard Training Center at Rock Hill
 Clarks Hill Training Center (ARNG)
 Marine Corps Recruit Depot (Beaufort) MCRD
 Marine Corps Air Station (Beaufort) MCAS

South Dakota 
 Fort Meade (ARNG)

Tennessee 
 Holston Army Ammunition Plant
 Kingston Demolition Range
 Milan Army Ammunition Plant

Texas 
 Camp Bowie
 Camp Bullis
 Camp Mabry
 Camp Maxey
 Camp Stanley
 Camp Swift
 Corpus Christi Army Depot
 Fort Bliss
 Fort Hood (Fort Cavazos)
 Fort Sam Houston, part of Joint Base San Antonio
 Fort Wolters (ARNG)
 Martindale Army Airfield
 Red River Army Depot

Utah 
 Camp W. G. Williams (ARNG)
 Dugway Proving Ground
 Fort Douglas (USAR)
 Tooele Army Depot
 Hill AFB

Vermont 
 Camp Ethan Allen Training Site (ARNG)
 Camp Johnson (ARNG)

Virginia 
 Camp Pendleton State Military Reservation (ARNG)
 Fort A.P. Hill (Fort Walker)
 Fort Belvoir
 Fort Eustis, part of Joint Base Langley-Eustis
 Fort Lee (Fort Gregg-Adams)
 Fort McNair (part of Joint Base Myer–Henderson Hall)
 Fort Myer (part of Joint Base Myer–Henderson Hall)
 Fort Pickett (ARNG) (Fort Barfoot)
 The Judge Advocate General's Legal Center and School
 Quantico Military Reservation
 National Ground Intelligence Center
 Radford Army Ammunition Plant
 Warrenton Training Center

Washington 
 Camp Murray (ANG/ARNG)
 Fort Lewis, part of Joint Base Lewis-McChord
 Yakima Training Center

West Virginia 
 Camp Dawson West Virginia Training Area (ARNG)

Wisconsin 
 Fort McCoy
 Camp Williams (ARNG)

Wyoming 
 Guernsey Maneuver Area (ARNG)
 F. E. Warren AFB

Foreign

Belgium
 Supreme Headquarters Allied Powers Europe

Bosnia and Herzegovina
 NATO Headquarters Sarajevo

Bulgaria

 Aitos Logistics Center, Burgas Province
 Bezmer Air Base, Yambol Province
 Graf Ignatievo Air Base, Plovdiv Province
 Novo Selo Range, Sliven Province

Cameroon
Contingency Location Garoua, Garoua

Germany

Bleidorn Housing Area, Ansbach
Dagger Complex, Darmstadt Training Center Griesheim
Edelweiss Lodge and Resort, Garmisch-Partenkirchen
Lucius D. Clay Kaserne (formerly Wiesbaden Army Airfield), Wiesbaden-Erbenheim
Germersheim Army Depot, Germersheim
Grafenwöhr Training Area, Grafenwöhr/Vilseck
Hohenfels Training Area/Joint Multinational Readiness Center, Hohenfels (Upper Palatinate)
Husterhoeh Kaserne, Pirmasens
Kaiserslautern Military Community
Katterbach Kaserne, Ansbach
Kelley Barracks, Stuttgart
Kleber Kaserne, Kaiserslautern Military Community
Lampertheim Training Area, Lampertheim
Landstuhl Regional Medical Center, Landstuhl
McCully Barracks, Wackernheim
Miesau Army Depot, Miesau
Oberdachstetten Storage Area, Ansbach
Panzer Kaserne, Böblingen
Patch Barracks, Stuttgart
Pulaski Barracks, Kaiserslautern
Rhine Ordnance Barracks, Kaiserslautern
Robinson Barracks, Stuttgart
Rose Barracks, Vilseck
Sembach Kaserne, Kaiserslautern
Sheridan Barracks, Garmisch-Partenkirchen
Shipton Kaserne, Ansbach
Smith Barracks, Baumholder
Storck Barracks, Illesheim
Stuttgart Army Airfield, Filderstadt
Mainz-Kastel
USAG Wiesbaden Military Training Area, Mainz, Gonsenheim/Mombach
USAG Wiesbaden Training Area, Mainz Finthen Airport
USAG Wiesbaden Radar Station, Mainz Finthen Airport
Urlas Housing and Shopping Complex, Ansbach

Israel
Dimona Radar Facility

Italy
 Camp Darby, Pisa-Livorno
 Caserma Ederle, Vicenza
 Caserma Renato Del Din, Vicenza

Iraq
 List of United States Army installations in Iraq

Japan
List of United States Army installations in Japan

Kosovo
 Camp Bondsteel
 Camp Film City

Kuwait

Camp Arifjan
Camp Buehring (formerly Camp Udairi)
Camp Patriot (shared with Kuwait Naval Base)
Camp Spearhead (shared with port of Ash Shuaiba)

Lithuania
 Camp Herkus, Pabradė

South Korea
 List of United States Army installations in South Korea

United States Marine Corps

Domestic 

Arizona
 MCAS Yuma
California
 MCLB Barstow
 MCB Camp Pendleton
 MCAS Miramar
 MCRD San Diego
 Mountain Warfare Training Center
 MCAGCC 29 Palms
Florida
 MCSF Blount Island
Georgia
 MCLB Albany
Hawaii
 MCB Hawaii

North Carolina
 MCAS Cherry Point
 MCAS New River
 MCB Camp Lejeune
South Carolina
 MCAS Beaufort
 MCRD Parris Island
Virginia
 Henderson Hall
 MCB Quantico
Washington, D.C.
 Marine Barracks, Washington, D.C.

Foreign

Germany 
 Camp Panzer Kaserne, Böblingen

Guam
Marine Corps Base Camp Blaz - part of Joint Region Marianas

Japan 
 Marine Corps Air Station Futenma, Okinawa
 Marine Corps Air Station Iwakuni, Yamaguchi Prefecture
 Marine Corps Base Camp Smedley D. Butler, Okinawa (''Note: the following camps are dispersed throughout Okinawa but are all under the administration of the MCB complex.)
 Camp Courtney
 Camp Fuji, Shizuoka Prefecture
 Camp Foster
 Camp Gonsalves (Jungle Warfare Training Center)
 Camp Hansen
 Camp Kinser
 Camp Lester
 Camp McTureous
 Camp Schwab

South Korea 
Camp Mujuk

United States Navy

Domestic

California
Naval Air Weapons Station China Lake
Naval Base Coronado
Naval Air Station Lemoore
Naval Postgraduate School
Naval Base Point Loma
Naval Base Ventura County
Naval Base San Diego

Connecticut
Naval Submarine Base New London

Florida
Naval Air Station Jacksonville
Naval Air Station Key West
Naval Station Mayport
Naval Air Warfare Center Training Systems Division
Naval Support Activity Panama City
Naval Air Station Pensacola
Naval Air Station Whiting Field

Georgia
Naval Submarine Base Kings Bay

Hawaii
Pacific Missile Range Facility
Joint Base Pearl Harbor Hickam

Illinois
Naval Station Great Lakes

Indiana
Naval Surface Warfare Center Crane Division

Louisiana
Naval Air Station Joint Reserve Base New Orleans

Maine
Portsmouth Naval Shipyard

Maryland
Naval Support Activity Annapolis
Naval Air Station Patuxent River
Naval Support Facility Thurmont
United States Naval Academy
Indian Head Naval Surface Warfare Center 
Joint Base Andrews

Mississippi
Naval Construction Battalion Center
Naval Air Station Meridian

Nevada
Naval Air Station Fallon

New Jersey
NWS Earle
Naval Support Activity Lakehurst - part of Joint Base McGuire–Dix–Lakehurst

New York
Naval Support Activity Saratoga Springs

Rhode Island
NS Newport

South Carolina
Naval Support Activity Charleston

Tennessee
Naval Support Activity Mid-South

Texas
Naval Air Station Corpus Christi
Naval Air Station Joint Reserve Base Fort Worth
Naval Air Station Kingsville

Virginia
Naval Support Activity South Potomac
Joint Expeditionary Base–Little Creek
Naval Station Norfolk
Naval Air Station Oceana
Surface Combat Systems Center Wallops Island
Naval Weapons Station Yorktown

Washington
Naval Base Kitsap
Naval Air Station Whidbey Island
Naval Station Everett

Washington, D.C.
Washington Navy Yard
United States Naval Research Laboratory

Foreign

Bahamas
Atlantic Undersea Test and Evaluation Center

Bahrain
Naval Support Activity Bahrain

British Indian Ocean Territory
Naval Support Facility Diego Garcia

Cuba
Guantanamo Bay Naval Base

Djibouti
Camp Lemonnier

Greece
Naval Support Activity Souda Bay

Guam
Naval Base Guam - part of Joint Region Marianas

Iceland
Naval Air Station Keflavík

Italy
Naval Support Activity Naples
Naval Air Station Sigonella

Japan
Naval Air Facility Atsugi
Misawa Air Base
Naval Forces Japan, Okinawa
United States Fleet Activities Sasebo
United States Fleet Activities Yokosuka

Poland
Naval Support Facility Redzikowo

Romania
Naval Support Facility Deveselu

Singapore
Singapore Area Coordinator

South Korea
Commander Fleet Activities Chinhae

Spain
Naval Station Rota Spain

United States Air Force

Domestic

Alabama
Maxwell Air Force Base

Alaska
Clear Air Force Station
Eielson Air Force Base
Joint Base Elmendorf Richardson

Arizona
Davis–Monthan Air Force Base
Luke Air Force Base

Arkansas
Little Rock Air Force Base

California
Beale Air Force Base
Edwards Air Force Base
Los Angeles Air Force Base
March Joint Air Reserve Base
Travis Air Force Base

Colorado
United States Air Force Academy

Delaware
Dover Air Force Base

Florida
Eglin Air Force Base
Hurlburt Field
MacDill Air Force Base
Tyndall Air Force Base

Georgia
Dobbins Air Reserve Base
Moody Air Force Base
Robins Air Force Base

Hawaii
Joint Base Pearl Harbor Hickam

Idaho
Mountain Home Air Force Base

Illinois
Scott Air Force Base

Indiana
Grissom Joint Air Reserve Base

Kansas
McConnell Air Force Base

Louisiana
Barksdale Air Force Base
New Orleans Joint Reserve Base

Maryland
Joint Base Andrews

Massachusetts
Hanscom Air Force Base
Westover Joint Air Reserve Base

Michigan
Selfridge Air National Guard Base

Mississippi
Columbus Air Force Base
Keesler Air Force Base

Missouri
Whiteman Air Force Base

Montana
Malmstrom Air Force Base

Nebraska
Offutt Air Force Base

Nevada
Nellis Air Force Base

New Jersey
McGuire Air Force Base - part of Joint Base McGuire-Dix-Lakehurst

New Mexico
Cannon Air Force Base
Holloman Air Force Base
Kirtland Air Force Base

North Carolina
Pope Air Force Base
Seymour Johnson Air Force Base

North Dakota
Grand Forks Air Force Base
Minot Air Force Base

Ohio
Wright-Patterson Air Force Base

Oklahoma
Altus Air Force Base
Tinker Air Force Base
Vance Air Force Base

South Carolina
Charleston Air Force Base
Shaw Air Force Base

South Dakota
Ellsworth Air Force Base

Tennessee
Arnold Air Force Base

Texas
Dyess Air Force Base
Ellington Field Joint Reserve Base
Goodfellow Air Force Base
Lackland Air Force Base
Laughlin Air Force Base
Randolph Air Force Base
Sheppard Air Force Base

Utah
Hill Air Force Base

Virginia
Langley Air Force Base

Washington
Fairchild Air Force Base
McChord AFB, part of Joint Base Lewis-McChord

Washington, D.C.
Bolling Air Force Base

Wyoming
Francis E. Warren Air Force Base

Foreign

Aruba 
 Queen Beatrix International Airport (Cooperative Security Location of U.S. Southern Command)

Indian Ocean Territory 
 Naval Support Facility Diego Garcia

Curaçao 
 Hato International Airport (Cooperative Security Location of U.S. Southern Command)

Estonia 
 Ämari Air Base

Germany 
 Ansbach
 NATO Air Base Geilenkirchen, Geilenkirchen
 Ramstein Air Base
 Spangdahlem Air Base

Guam
Andersen Air Force Base - part of Joint Region Marianas

Honduras 
 Soto Cano Air Base

Italy 
 Aviano Air Base
 Camp Darby (Pisa-Livorno)
 Sigonella Naval Air Station

Japan 
 Kadena Air Base, Okinawa Prefecture
 Misawa Air Base, Misawa, Aomori
 Yokota Air Base, Tokyo

Kenya 
 Camp Simba

Kuwait 
 Ahmad al-Jaber Air Base
 Ali Al Salem Air Base

Lithuania 
 Šiauliai Air Base, Siauliai

Netherlands 
 Volkel Air Base

Poland 
 Łask Air Base

Portugal (Azores) 
 Lajes Air Base

Qatar 
 Al Udeid Air Base

Romania 
 Mihail Kogălniceanu Air Base
 Câmpia Turzii Air Base

South Korea 
 Kunsan Air Base
 Osan Air Base

Sovereign Base Areas of Akrotiri and Dhekelia (Cyprus) 
 RAF Akrotiri

Spain 
 Morón Air Base

Turkey 
 Incirlik Air Base

United Kingdom 
 RAF Alconbury, Huntingdonshire 
 RAF Croughton, Northamptonshire
 RAF Fairford, Gloucestershire
 RAF Lakenheath, Brandon, Suffolk
 RAF Mildenhall, Mildenhall, Suffolk
 RAF Molesworth, Cambridgeshire

United States Space Force

Domestic 
Buckley Space Force Base, Colorado
Cape Canaveral Space Force Station, Florida
Cape Cod Space Force Station, Massachusetts
Cavalier Space Force Station, North Dakota
Cheyenne Mountain Space Force Station, Colorado
Clear Space Force Station, Alaska
Kaena Point Space Force Station, Hawaii
New Boston Space Force Station, New Hampshire
Patrick Space Force Base, Florida
Peterson Space Force Base, Colorado
Schriever Space Force Base, Colorado
Vandenberg Space Force Base, California

Foreign

Greenland (Denmark) 
 Thule Air Base

United States Coast Guard

Domestic

U.S. Territories
Marine Safety Detachment Saipan, Northern Mariana Islands
Marine Safety Detachment American Samoa

Foreign

Bahrain 
Patrol Forces Southwest Asia
USCGC Charles Moulthrope
USCGC Robert Goldman
USCGC Glen Harris
USCGC Emlen Tunnel
USCGC Maui
USCGC Monomoy

Cuba 

 Air station Miami-Navsta Guantanamo Bay

Germany 

 Maritime & International Law-U.S. Africa Command

United Kingdom 

 HMS Support Program-Portsmouth

Japan 

 USCG Activities Far East

Netherlands 

 USCG Activities Europe

Saudi Arabia 

 Saudi Maritime Infrastructure Protection Force

Singapore 

 Activities Far East-Singapore

See also
 Base Realignment and Closure
 United States military deployments
 List of United States drone bases
 Lists of military installations

Explanatory notes

References

Sources

Further reading

External links

 Department of Defense, Base Structure Report(PDF) FY 2018 Baseline

 Bases
.